Divine Mercy Sanctuary in Białystok is a church in the district of Białostoczek at the Radzymińska Street 1.

History

In August 1982, the City Council received a letter asking for permission to build a church. This was requested by the residents from Poleska Street. The positive answer came after a few months, in December of the same year. This took place after previous unsuccessful attempts by priest Zbigniew Krupski to obtain permission to build a temple at Poleska Street. It was erected in 1984. In 1988 the remains of Michał Sopoćko, the spiritual director of Faustina Kowalska, was moved here. In 1993 also a relic of Faustina Kowalska was set. In 1996 besides the church the papal altar from 1991 was reconstructed. Consecration of the church was held in 2007.

On September 28, 2008 the solemn beatification of Michał Sopoćko took place here. Among others, cardinals Angelo Amato, Stanisław Dziwisz, Audrys Bačkis and Józef Glemp, about 100 bishops as well as presidents of Poland: Ryszard Kaczorowski, Lech Kaczyński and Bronisław Komorowski were present.

See also 

 Michał Sopoćko
 Faustyna Kowalska
 Divine Mercy
 Divine Mercy Sanctuary (Kraków)

External links 
 The website of the archdiocese of Białystok
 A website about blessed Michał Sopoćko

Divine Mercy
Roman Catholic churches in Białystok
Catholic pilgrimage sites
Catholic devotions
Roman Catholic churches completed in 2007
Roman Catholic churches completed in 1984
20th-century Roman Catholic church buildings in Poland
21st-century churches in Poland